Takydromus albomaculosus is a species of lizard in the family Lacertidae. It is endemic to China.

References

Takydromus
Reptiles described in 2017
Endemic fauna of China
Reptiles of China
Taxa named by Ying-Yong Wang
Taxa named by Shi-Ping Gong
Taxa named by Peng Liu
Taxa named by Xin Wang (herpetologist)